Euthelyconychia is a genus of flies in the family Tachinidae.

Species
E. clausa Townsend, 1927
E. galerucellae (Villeneuve, 1933)
E. nana (Curran, 1929)
E. vexans (Curran, 1925)
E. xylota (Curran, 1927)

References

Diptera of South America
Diptera of North America
Exoristinae
Tachinidae genera
Taxa named by Charles Henry Tyler Townsend